George Maddison (6 October 1930 in Sculcoates, England – 1987) was an English footballer.

External links
Post War English & Scottish Football League A - Z Player's Transfer Database profile

1930 births
1987 deaths
Aldershot F.C. players
Association football goalkeepers
English footballers
Footballers from Kingston upon Hull
People from Sculcoates
York City F.C. players
Corby Town F.C. players
Date of death missing